Chan Kam Hong (born 29 July 1946) is a Hong Kong former swimmer. He competed in the men's 200 metre backstroke at the 1964 Summer Olympics.

References

External links
 

1946 births
Living people
Hong Kong male backstroke swimmers
Olympic swimmers of Hong Kong
Swimmers at the 1964 Summer Olympics
Place of birth missing (living people)